Albin John "Al" Kaporch (October 6, 1913 – October 14, 2004) was an American football player. 

Kaporch was born in 1913 in Jenkins Township, Pennsylvania. His father was a Lithuanian immigrant who worked in the Pennsylvania coal mines and died in a mine collapse. He attended Pittston High School and played college football at St. Bonaventure. H

He played professional football in the National Football League (NFL) as a tackle and guard for the Detroit Lions from 1943 to 1945. He appeared in 22 NFL games, 21 as a starter, and intercepted three interceptions.

He married Helen Ann Janoski in 1951.

References

1913 births
2004 deaths
St. Bonaventure Brown Indians football players
Detroit Lions players
Players of American football from Pennsylvania